Sabira Khan is a Producer and Assistant to Producers.  She has been part of TV series such as 24 and Law & Order: Los Angeles as well as the movie G.I. Joe: The Rise of Cobra. She has been part of NBC Universal, 20th Century Fox and Paramount Pictures.

Filmography
 Law & Order: Los Angeles - 2010
 24 - 2010
 G.I. Joe: The Rise of Cobra - 2009

References

External links
 

American film producers
Living people
Santa Clara University alumni
Year of birth missing (living people)